Sadıkoğlu is a Turkish surname formed by adding the Turkish patronymic suffix -oğlu with the meaning "son of" to the Muslim masculine given name of Arabic origin Sadiq/Sadik (honest, sincere) and may refer to:

 Birgül Sadıkoğlu (born 2000), Turkish women's footballer
 Kahraman Sadıkoğlu (born 19??), Turkish businessman

References

Turkish-language surnames
Patronymic surnames
Surnames from given names